The phrase Fratelli d'Italia (Brothers of Italy) can refer to:

"Fratelli d'Italia", unofficial and informal name indicating Il Canto degli Italiani, the national anthem of Italy
Brothers of Italy, an Italian political party
Fratelli d'Italia (1989 film), 1989 film starring Sabrina Salerno
Fratelli d'Italia (1952 film), 1952 film